The Atlantic Hockey Association (AHA) is an NCAA Men's Division I Ice Hockey conference which operates primarily in the northeastern United States. It participates in the NCAA's Division I as an ice hockey-only conference. Unlike several other college athletic conferences, Atlantic Hockey has no women's division, though it shares some organizational and administrative roles (and two universities) with the women's-only College Hockey America.

It was formed in 1997 and began play in the 1998–1999 season as the hockey division of the Metro Atlantic Athletic Conference (MAAC). Within three years, it was granted an automatic bid to the NCAA Tournament. However, in 2003, Iona and Fairfield dropped hockey, leaving Canisius as the only full MAAC member that sponsored hockey. This proved somewhat problematic for MAAC Hockey, since conference bylaws only allowed full members to vote. On June 30, 2003, MAAC Hockey broke off from the MAAC and reorganized as Atlantic Hockey.

Membership

Current

Future

Former
Iona College (Dropped Hockey), 2003
Fairfield University (Dropped Hockey), 2003
Quinnipiac University (ECAC Hockey), 2005
University of Connecticut (Hockey East), 2014

Timeline

Atlantic Hockey champions

Atlantic Hockey tournament champions by school 

No tournament was held in 2020 due to the Covid-19 pandemic.

National tournament history 

 * – at-large selection.

 † – Tournament canceled due to COVID-19 pandemic

Conference arenas

Awards
At the conclusion of each regular season schedule the coaches of each Atlantic Hockey team vote which players they choose to be on the three or four All-Conference Teams: first team, second team and rookie team (third team beginning in 2007). Additionally they vote to award 7 of the 9 individual trophies to an eligible player and 1 team award at the same time. Atlantic Hockey also awards a regular season scoring title that is not voted on as well as a Conference Tournament Most Valuable Player, which is voted on at the conclusion of the conference tournament. All individual and team awards have been awarded since Atlantic Hockey's inaugural season in 2003–04.

All-Conference Teams

Individual Awards

Team Awards

See also
MAAC Awards

References

External links
Atlantic Hockey Online

 
Haverhill, Massachusetts
Articles which contain graphical timelines
College ice hockey conferences in the United States